This article provides a list of famous raccoons that appeared in works of fiction.

Raccoons in mythology

Azeban, a trickster figure in the mythology of the Abenaki tribe
Raccoons were the subject of folk tales of several other Native American tribes, but they were rather representatives of the species as a whole than individuals with a given name.

Raccoons in literature

 Adam Raccoon from the children's book series Parables for Kids by Glen Keane.
 Bobby Coon from the children's books by Thornton Burgess.
 Chester from the children's book The Kissing Hand and following sequels by Audrey Penn.
 Doc Raccoon from the Catfish Bend series by Ben Lucien Burman.
 Eddie the Rac from the children's book series Hank the Cowdog by John R. Erickson.
 Jesse Coon James from the children's classic My Side of the Mountain by Jean Craighead George.
 Tripod from the Dave Robicheaux series by James Lee Burke.
 Seeker-After-Patterns from Beyond Infinity by Gregory Benford.
 Little Brother the animal familiar of Wizard Listens-to-Wind in the Dresden Files by Jim Butcher

Raccoons in non-fiction literature

 Pepper from Pepper by Barbara Leonard Reynolds
 Rascal from Rascal by Sterling North

Raccoons in comic books and comic strips

 Avery and Timulty from Ozy and Millie by D. C. Simpson.
 Ranger Rick from Ranger Rick by the National Wildlife Federation.
 RJ from Over the Hedge by Michael Fry and T. Lewis.
 Rocket Raccoon from Marvel Comics.
 Roderick from Rock Jaw: Master of the Eastern Border, the fifth book in the Bone series by Jeff Smith.
 The Raccoon from Nocturnals by Dan Brereton.
 Woo, Lily and several minor characters from Sandra and Woo by Oliver Knörzer and Puri Andini
 Rackety Coon Chile from Pogo by Walt Kelly.

Raccoons in film

 Joey from Dr. Dolittle 2 by 20th Century Fox.
 Rascal from Rascal by Walt Disney Pictures, based on the book by Sterling North
 Rocket from Guardians of the Galaxy, Guardians of the Galaxy Vol. 2, Avengers: Infinity War, and Avengers: Endgame by Marvel Studios, adapted from the Marvel Comics character listed previously

Raccoons in animation

 Abe and Ken, from Urban Vermin by YTV and Decode Entertainment.
 Agatha, the witch from Summer Camp Island by Cartoon  Network and HBO Max
 Bert, Ralph, Melissa, Bentley and Lisa Raccoon from The Raccoons by Hinton Animation Studios.
 Bright Heart Raccoon, a Care Bear Cousin.
 Chizuru, from BNA: Brand New Animal by Trigger.
 Gu, from Non Non Biyori by Silver Link.
 Gururu, from Pretty Cure All Stars by Toei Animation
 Jeb Bush, from Family Guy by Fox Entertainment Company
 JoJo and Joey, two rapping raccoons from We Bare Bears by Cartoon Network
 Josephine, from Soredemo Machi wa Mawatteiru by Shaft.
 Lifty and Shifty, from Happy Tree Friends by Mondo Mini Shows.
 Little David, from The Kingdom Chums: Little David's Adventure by ABC Productions and DIC Enterprises.
 Maynard from PAW Patrol by Spin Master
 Meeko from Pocahontas and Pocahontas II: Journey to a New World by Walt Disney Animation Studios.
 Obediah the Wonder Raccoon, from The Shnookums and Meat Funny Cartoon Show by Walt Disney Television Animation.
 Pinch Raccoon, Scootch Raccoon, et al. from PB&J Otter by Walt Disney Animation Studios and Jumbo Pictures.
 Raccoon, voiced by Liam Neeson, the villain in The Nut Job.
 Papa-san "Raccoon", from Dick Figures by Mondo Media.
 Raccoon and Constable Raccoon from Franklin, a children's television series based on the books by Brenda Clark and Paulette Bourgeois.
 Randolph, from 64 Zoo Lane by Millimages.
 Rascal, from Araiguma Rascal (Rascal the Raccoon) by Nippon Animation, based on the book by Sterling North.
 Rick Raccoon, from Shirt Tales by Hanna-Barbera.
 Rigby and his brother Don, from Regular Show by Cartoon Network.
 RJ from Over the Hedge by DreamWorks Animation, based on the comic strip by Michael Fry and T. Lewis (see above) and is voiced by Bruce Willis.
 Rory Raccoon, from Linus the Lionhearted by Ed Graham Productions.
 Roy Rakoon, from Talking Tom and Friends (TV series) a show by Outfit7.
 Ruddiger, from Tangled: The Series by Walt Disney Television Animation.
 Smokey, from The Dukes by Hanna-Barbera.
 Timothy and Claude, from Timothy Goes to School by Nelvana.
 Ty Coon, from Deputy Dawg by Terrytoons.
 Weecha, from The Son of Bigfoot.

Raccoons in television

 Dennis from Wingin' It, by Nickelodeon.

Raccoons in video games

 BK and the Raccoon King from Donut County by Annapurna Interactive.
 Chota from Inherit the Earth: Quest for the Orb by The Dreamers Guild.
 Jojo from Rocket: Robot on Wheels by Sucker Punch Productions.
 Macaraccoon from Viva Piñata by Rare.
 Marine the Raccoon from Sonic Rush Adventure by Dimps and Sonic Team.
Rocky from "Pocky & Rocky" by Natsume.
 Sly Cooper and the Cooper Clan from the Sly Cooper series by Sucker Punch Productions.
Bobby, Frankie, Joey, Escobar, and Tommy Raccoon are mounts from Heroes of the Storm by Blizzard Entertainment.
Skelter, from Genesis, the multiplayer online battle arena by Rampage Games

Other fictional raccoons

 Bandito, from Beanie Babies.
 Omer, the mascot of the Odyssey of the Mind organization.
 Roni Raccoon, the mascot of the 1980 Winter Olympics in Lake Placid, New York.
 RaziAdAstra, Twitch Streamer

References

Raccoons